Noor Bisan (born January 17, 1995) is an Druze-Israeli footballer, who plays for Hapoel Karmiel in the Liga Bet.

Noor made his debut for Netanya on February 9, 2013, in a league game against Bnei Yehuda.

External links
 

1995 births
Living people
Arab citizens of Israel
Israeli footballers
Israeli Druze
Arab-Israeli footballers
Druze sportspeople
Maccabi Netanya F.C. players
Hapoel Beit She'an F.C. players
Maccabi Kiryat Gat F.C. players
Maccabi Ironi Kiryat Ata F.C. players
Hapoel Bik'at HaYarden F.C. players
Maccabi Herzliya F.C. players
Hapoel Kfar Saba F.C. players
Maccabi Jaffa F.C. players
F.C. Haifa Robi Shapira players
Ironi Tiberias F.C. players
Hapoel Karmiel F.C. players
F.C. Tzeirei Kafr Kanna players
Israeli Premier League players
Liga Leumit players
Footballers from Julis
Association football forwards